Carl Kuntz (29 July 1770, Mannheim - 8 September 1830, Karlsruhe) was a German landscape painter and etcher. Many of his works also feature animals.

Life and work 
From 1791 to 1792, he travelled throughout Switzerland and North Italy. During that time he learned printmaking, and came to prefer what would later be called "painting en plein aire".  
After returning home, he launched his career with a portfolio of graphics called Schwetzinger Stiche (1793). He worked as a draftsman, but also made his own aquatints.

In 1804, efforts to prevent the closure of his alma mater, the Drawing Academy, had failed. Deprived of a potential position there, he made efforts to be appointed a court painter for the recently created Electorate of Baden. In 1806, after the Electorate had become the Grand Duchy of Baden, he was commissioned to decorate , near Pforzheim, with landscapes. 
Four years later, he was chosen to give drawing lessons to Grand Duchess Stephanie.

He began featuring animals in his paintings after 1815, when he made a copy of a painting by Paulus Potter ("Spring Morning") that proved to be very popular with the nobility. In 1829, Grand Duke Louis appointed him Director of the Royal Gallery, but he died after holding that position for only a year.

Sources 
 
 Alfred Woltmann: Karl Kuntz. In: Badische Biographien. 1875, Part 1, pp. 487/488 (Online).
 
 "Kuntz, Carl", In: Allgemeines Lexikon der Bildenden Künstler von der Antike bis zur Gegenwart, Vol. 22: Krügner–Leitch, E. A. Seemann, Leipzig, 1928 pp. 114–116

External links 

 More works by Kuntz @ ArtNet

1770 births
1830 deaths
18th-century German painters
18th-century German male artists
German landscape painters
German painters of animals
Court painters
Artists from Mannheim
19th-century German painters
19th-century German male artists